Art Hsu is an American actor. He is best known for playing KCDC in The FP  film series, and Johnny Vang in Crank: High Voltage opposite Jason Statham. Other credits include The Girl from the Naked Eye, and Silver Case.. He has appeared in music videos for Danko Jones, The Game (rapper), and Slayer. As of 2023, Hsu is represented commercially by Aqua Talent Agency in Los Angeles, and he is predominantly pursuing commercial work, in addition to his established independent film career.

Filmography

References

External links

Living people
Year of birth missing (living people)
Place of birth missing (living people)
People from Queens, New York
People from Flushing, Queens
Male actors from New York City
Boston College alumni